Rupelramphastoides is an extinct piciform from the Lower Oligocene of Central Europe (Germany). Only one species are recorded for genus, Rupelramphastoides knopfi, and it is classified "family incertae sedis", pending discovery of additional specimens.

References

Piciformes
Oligocene birds
Prehistoric birds of Europe
Fossil taxa described in 2005